Silvano Simeon (27 October 1945 – 12 December 2010) was an Italian discus thrower. He competed at the 1972 and 1976 Olympics and finished in 10th and 19th place, respectively.

Biography
During his career Simeon won 10 national titles (1966, 1967, 1969–1974, 1977, 1979), and took part in 52 international competitions. In retirement he worked as athletics coach.

Achievements

Note

References

External links
 

1945 births
2010 deaths
Sportspeople from Udine
Italian male discus throwers
Olympic athletes of Italy
Athletes (track and field) at the 1972 Summer Olympics
Athletes (track and field) at the 1976 Summer Olympics
Mediterranean Games gold medalists for Italy
Mediterranean Games silver medalists for Italy
Mediterranean Games bronze medalists for Italy
Athletes (track and field) at the 1967 Mediterranean Games
Athletes (track and field) at the 1971 Mediterranean Games
Athletes (track and field) at the 1975 Mediterranean Games
Athletes (track and field) at the 1979 Mediterranean Games
Universiade medalists in athletics (track and field)
Mediterranean Games medalists in athletics
Universiade bronze medalists for Italy
Medalists at the 1970 Summer Universiade